Monkton Bluefriars Boat Club was founded in 1956 as an Open Boat Club, originally called Monkton Blue Friars BC, to encourage former pupils and staff who had been members of Monkton Combe School Boat Club to meet socially and in boats.  It was first registered with the Amateur Rowing Association in 1964 and is now registered with British Rowing.  Its first Annual General Meeting was held in 1964 and its parent club is Monkton Combe School Boat Club. In 1995 the Monkton Bluefriars Charitable Trust was established to encourage a greater level of charitable giving in order to support young rowers.  The purpose of the Trust was widened to include support for students rowing in other clubs as well as Monktonians.  The Trust supplies grants to help fund equipment or events for athletes who cannot afford to cover the costs themselves, depending on their financial situation.

Charitable Aims 
The charity's aims are twofold:

 To promote the physical education and development of pupils, former pupils, staff and parents of Monkton Combe School by encouraging and facilitating the sport of rowing through the provision of facilities, equipment and financial support, including sponsorship of individuals or crews training for and participating in competitive events where such individuals or crews represent the School or Monkton Bluefriars Boat Club.
 To promote the physical education and development of students of such other educational establishments as the Trustees shall in their absolute discretion determine, by encouraging and facilitating the sport of rowing through the provision of facilities, equipment and financial support, including sponsorship of individuals or crews training for and participating in competitive events.

Events 
The Club organises the Monkton Bluefriars Small Boats Head every October, usually held from Monkton Combe School's John Chaplin Boathouse at Saltford, near Bath, Somerset, and an annual dinner at the Leander Club.

Newsletters 
The Club has produced an annual printed newsletter since November 1981, edited by Monkton Combe School's former master and rowing coach Julian Bewick.  A decision was taken to cease producing printed copies of the newsletter after the 2020-21 edition and to continue only with digital editions.

References

External links 

Boating associations